Tidjikja Airport  is an airport serving Tidjikja, the capital of the Tagant region of central Mauritania.
on 1 July 1994 Air Mauritanie Flight 625 crashed near the airport only 13 people survived.it is the deadliest one in Mauritania.[1]

References

External links
 

Airports in Mauritania
Tagant Region